Sakha Avia Flight 301 was a scheduled domestic passenger flight from Kutana to Aldan via Uchur in Russia. On 26 August 1993 the Let L-410 Turbolet operating the flight crashed on approach to Aldan airport, killing all 24 people on board. It is the deadliest aviation disaster involving the Let L-410 Turbolet.

Accident 
The aircraft was on final approach to Aldan Airport. The flaps were extended for landing, however, when this happened, the aircraft abruptly pitched up to 40 degrees, stalled and crashed into the ground  from the runway. All 24 people on board were killed.

Aircraft 
The aircraft involved was a three-year-old L-410UVP-E (registration RA-67656) which first flew in 1990. The aircraft was powered by two Walter M-601E engines.

Investigation 
The investigation determined that the aircraft was overloaded, moving the center of gravity to the rear.

See also 
 List of accidents and incidents involving the Let L-410 Turbolet

References 

1993 disasters in Russia
Accidents and incidents involving the Let L-410 Turbolet
Aviation accidents and incidents in 1993
Aviation accidents and incidents in Russia